Elachista vegliae is a moth of the family Elachistidae. It is found in Croatia, North Macedonia, Bulgaria and Turkey.

References

vegliae
Moths described in 1978
Moths of Europe
Moths of Asia